Montenegrin literature may refer to:

 Literature of Montenegro, the entire (historical and modern) corpus of literature created on the territory covered by modern Montenegro
 Literature in Montenegrin language, literature created in Montenegrin language, a newly codified Serbo-Croatian variety

See also 
 Montenegro (disambiguation)
 Montenegrin (disambiguation)
 Montenegrins (disambiguation)